Tetter refers to any skin condition characterized by reddish vesicular eruptions and intense itching. Common diseases called tetter include:

Eczema and Duhring's disease
Herpes
Porphyria cutanea tarda (PCT)
Psoriasis
Ringworm and jock itch

Cutaneous conditions
Inflammations